Savyntsi is an urban-type settlement in Izium Raion of Kharkiv Oblast in Ukraine. It is located on the left bank of the Siverskyi Donets. Savyntsi hosts the administration of Savyntsi settlement hromada, one of the hromadas of Ukraine. Population: 

Until 18 July 2020, Savyntsi belonged to Balakliia Raion. The raion was abolished in July 2020 as part of the administrative reform of Ukraine, which reduced the number of raions of Kharkiv Oblast to seven. The area of Balakliia Raion was merged into Izium Raion.

Economy

Transportation
Savyntsi railway station is on the railway line connecting Kharkiv and Lyman via Izium. There is frequent passenger traffic.

The settlement has road access to  Highway M03 connecting Kharkiv and Sloviansk. It is also connected by local roads with Kharkiv via Balakliia and with Kupiansk via Borova.

References

Urban-type settlements in Izium Raion
Izyumsky Uyezd